Pavlo Hnatovych Zhytetskyi (January 4, 1837 in Kremenchuk - March 18, 1911 in Kyiv) was a Ukrainian linguist, philologist, ethnographer and literary historian, Doctor of Russian Literature (1908). For a long time worked as a teacher of Russian language in Kamianets-Podilskyi and Kyiv.

He was a member of the Imperial Russian Geographical Society (starting in 1873), the Historical Society of Nestor the Chronicler (starting in 1879), the Shevchenko Scientific Society (starting in 1903), and the Ukrainian Scientific Society in Kyiv (starting in 1907), a corresponding member of the Russian Academy of Sciences (since 1898), he became the first honorary member of that society in 1908.

Pavlo Zhytetskyi is regarded as one of the first historians of the literary Ukrainian language.

See also
 Drahomanivka

References
 
 

1837 births
1911 deaths
People from Kremenchuk
People from Poltava Governorate
Philologists
19th-century Ukrainian historians
Literary historians
Ukrainian ethnographers
Linguists from Ukraine
Members of the Shevchenko Scientific Society
Corresponding members of the Saint Petersburg Academy of Sciences
Russian Geographical Society
Ukrainian lexicographers
Burials at Baikove Cemetery